Faith: A Holiday Album is the second holiday album and tenth studio album by saxophonist Kenny G. It was released by Arista Records on November 16, 1999 and peaked at number 1 on the Contemporary Jazz Albums chart, number 4 on the R&B/Hip-Hop Albums chart, number 5 on the Internet Albums chart, and number 6 on the Billboard 200.  The album also received a Grammy nomination for Best Pop Instrumental Album.

Faith: A Holiday Album was also the best-selling Christmas album of 1999 in the United States according to sales figures from Nielsen/SoundScan, with total sales of 1,575,000 copies that year.  As of November 2014, the album has sold 2,750,000 copies in the U.S. according to SoundScan.

On November 5, 2002, Faith: A Holiday Album was certified Triple Platinum by the Recording Industry Association of America for shipments of three million copies in the U.S.

Kenny G's rendition of "Auld Lang Syne" featured guest musicians Yanni on piano and keyboards as well as Charlie Adams on drums.

Reception

Track listing
 "Let It Snow! Let It Snow! Let It Snow!" (Sammy Cahn/Jule Styne) - 3:08
 "The First Noel" (William Sandys) - 3:08
 "I'll Be Home for Christmas" (Kim Gannon/Walter Kent/Buck Ram) - 3:33
 "Sleigh Ride" (Leroy Anderson/Mitchell Parish) - 3:48
 "The Christmas Song" (Mel Tormé/Robert Wells) - 4:02
 "Medley: We Three Kings/Carol of the Bells" (John Henry Hopkins/Mikhail Leontovich/Peter Wilhousky) - 4:07
 "O Christmas Tree" (Traditional) - 2:39
 "Santa Claus Is Coming to Town" (J. Fred Coots/Haven Gillespie) - 3:52
 "Eternal Light (A Chanukah Song)" (Walter Afanasieff/Kenny G) - 2:53
 "Ave Maria" (Franz Schubert) - 4:30
 "Auld Lang Syne" (Robert Burns/Traditional) - 4:56 
 "Auld Lang Syne: The Millennium Mix" (Robert Burns/Traditional) - 7:53
 "Voice" (Bonus track) - 7:53

Personnel 
 Kenny G – soprano saxophone (1, 2, 4-7, 9, 10, 11), tenor saxophone (3, 8)
 Randy Waldman – acoustic piano (1, 4, 8)
 Greg Phillinganes – Fender Rhodes (1, 4, 8)
 Walter Afanasieff – keyboards (2, 3, 6, 7, 11), synthesizers (2, 3, 6, 7, 11), drum and rhythm programming (2, 3, 6, 7, 11), acoustic piano (5, 9, 10)
 Greg Bieck – digital programming (2, 3, 6, 7, 11), Macintosh programming (2, 3, 6, 7, 11), additional drum and rhythm programming (6, 7, 11)
 Yanni – keyboards (11), acoustic piano (11)
 Nathan East – bass (1, 4, 8)
 Ricky Lawson – drums (1, 4, 8)
 Charlie Adams – drums (11)
 Paulinho da Costa – percussion (1, 4, 8)
 William Ross – orchestra arrangements and conductor (1-7, 9, 10)
 Chris Bordman – orchestra arrangements and conductor (8)
 The Music Team – orchestra contractors (1-7, 9, 10)

Production 
 Kenny G – producer, arrangements 
 Walter Afanasieff – producer, arrangements
 Humberto Gatica – recording, mixing (1-4, 6-11)
 David Gleeson – recording (2, 3, 6, 7, 9, 10, 11), additional recording (5)
 David Frazier – recording (3, 10)
 Mick Guzauski – mixing (5)
 Chris Brooke – assistant engineer (1-4, 6-11)
 Peter Doell – assistant engineer (1-4, 6-11)
 Mark Eshelman – assistant engineer (1-4, 6-11)
 Grant Schmitz – assistant engineer (1-4, 6-11)
 James Stone – assistant engineer (1, 4, 8)
 Kent Matcke – assistant engineer (2, 9)
 Pete Krawiec – assistant engineer (11)
 Vlado Meller – mastering at Sony Music Studios (New York City, New York).
 Margery Greenspan – art direction 
 Jeff Schultz – design 
 Patrick Demarcheller – photography 
 Dennis Turner – management

Charts

Weekly charts

Year-end charts

Singles
Information taken from this source.

See also
 List of Billboard Top Holiday Albums number ones of the 2000s

References

1999 Christmas albums
Christmas albums by American artists
Jazz Christmas albums
Arista Records Christmas albums
Kenny G albums
Albums produced by Walter Afanasieff